The Six Divisions of Cavalry, also known as the Kapıkulu Süvarileri ("Household Slave Cavalry"), was a corps of elite cavalry soldiers in the army of the Ottoman Empire (Sipahi). There were not really six, but four, divisions in the corps. Two of the six were sub-divisions. The divisions were:

 Sipāhiyān (roughly, "Armymen")
 Silah-dārān (From Persian, translated roughly as "weaponbearers")
 Ulufeciyān (translated as "stipendiaries"), organised into two sub-divisions:

 
 Garibān (translated roughly as "strangers"), organised into two sub-divisions:
 Garips of the Left
 

The elite cavalry was the mounted counterpart to the Janissaries and played an important part in the Ottoman Army. The Six Divisions were probably founded during the reign of Sultan Mehmed II (r. 1451–1481), but the Sipahis had existed since 1326.

Sources

See also
 Military of the Ottoman Empire

Cavalry units and formations of the Ottoman Empire